Ciechanowiec is a small town in Gmina Ciechanowiec, Wysokie Mazowieckie County, Podlaskie Voivodeship, eastern Poland. As of December 2021, the town has a population of 4,511.

History
In the sixteenth century the city belonged to the Kiszka family. In the mid-sixteenth century Castellan of Trakai, Piotr Kiszka built a castle on the right bank of the river Nurzec, northeast of the town. Between 1617–1642, Mikołaj Kiszka ordered to build heavy defensive walls around the fortress, but soon the castle burned down during the Deluge, and the surviving buildings with the newly built residence for the Ossoliński family were later blown up and destroyed by the Imperial Russian Army during World War I (1915). To this day only the foundations and the moat still exist.  

The forthcoming owners of the city were: The Bremmer, Ossoliński, Szczukow and Ciecierski families. In particular, the Ossoliński family in the second half of the seventeenth century invested in the development of the city. 

In 1736–1739, a brick church of the Holy Trinity and the Sisters of Mercy hospital was built, according to the draft of Warmia's architect Jan Adrian Kluk. His son, Fr. Jan Krzysztof Kluk (1739–1796), the local parish priest, devoted to natural history, became one of the most important Polish naturalists of the Enlightenment. He is the author of the first comprehensive textbook in the Polish language on agriculture, as well as other pioneering scientific topics, as well as school textbooks written on request of the Commission of National Education. The scope of the research included both botany and zoology, and natural pharmaceuticals.

In the era of the partitions, Ciechanowiec was passed onto Prussia, and after the Congress of Vienna to the Russian Empire. Later the city was divided into two parts: right bank (called New Town or "Polish section"), was part of the Polish Kingdom and the left bank Old Town ("Rus section") in Russia. As a result of the November and January Uprisings, the right bank of Ciechanowiec lost the city rights in 1870. At the end of the nineteenth century, the textile industry rapidly developed in the city. Ciechanowiec was also very popular for various horse fairs. Significant damage from the times of World War I and the Polish–Soviet War were slowly repaired in the interwar period.

Before the beginning of World War II, 55% of the town's inhabitants were Jews. At that time the city was known to a large number of workshops, mainly Jewish.  In 1938, the left bank of Ciechanowiec (then located in the district of Bielsko) was attached to the right part of the town (on the status of the settlement), previously located in the district of Wysokomazowieckie (in the municipality of Klukowo).

During World War II, the city was badly destroyed, as a result of the Molotov-Ribbentrop Pact, first by the soldiers of the Red Army, and after June 1941 by the German Army. The Jewish population was almost completely exterminated at the Treblinka extermination camp. After the war, reconstruction lasted a long time and the city has not regained its former importance and population that it once had.

Jewish family names like Ciechanowiec, Ciechanowiecki, Ciechanowicz, Ciechanowski and Chechanover originated from this town.

Geography
The Nurzec River divides the town into two parts: the Left Side and the Right Side.

Demographics
According to the 1921 census, the village was inhabited by 3.291 people, among whom 1.568 were Roman Catholic, 39 Orthodox, 34 Evangelical and 1.649 Mosaic. At the same time, 1.653 inhabitants declared Polish nationality, 11 Belarusian, 21 German and 1.693 Jewish. There were 361 residential buildings in the village.

Detailed data as of 31 December 2021:

Monuments
 The Holy Trinity Church
 The monastery-hospital complex
 The Lord's Ascension Orthodox Church
 The Mansion-Park Complex
 Mazowiecko-Podlaski Open-Air Museum of Agriculture

Notable people 

 Alexander Chizhevsky
 Jan Krzysztof Kluk
Benjamin Mazar (1906-1995), Israeli historian and archeologist; President of the Hebrew University of Jerusalem
 Ivan Solonevich
  (not native)

References

External links 
 Ciechanowiec Online
 JewishGen Locality Page - Ciechanowiec, Poland from Museum of Jewish Heritage.

 
Cities and towns in Podlaskie Voivodeship
Wysokie Mazowieckie County
Belsky Uyezd (Grodno Governorate)
Białystok Voivodeship (1919–1939)
Belastok Region
Shtetls
Holocaust locations in Poland